Events in the year 2017 in Mongolia.

Incumbents

President: Tsakhiagiin Elbegdorj (until 10 July); Khaltmaagiin Battulga (from 10 July)
Prime Minister: Jargaltulgyn Erdenebat (until 4 October); Ukhnaagiin Khürelsükh (from 4 October)

Events
26 June – the 2017 Mongolian presidential election

Deaths

31 January – Tokitenkū Yoshiaki, sumo wrestler (b. 1979).

References

 
2010s in Mongolia
Years of the 21st century in Mongolia
Mongolia
Mongolia